The 1935 Kentucky gubernatorial election was held on November 5, 1935. Democratic nominee Happy Chandler defeated Republican nominee King Swope with 60.79% of the vote.

Primary elections
Primary elections were held on August 3, 1935.

Democratic primary

Candidates
Happy Chandler, incumbent Lieutenant Governor
Thomas Rhea, State Highway Commissioner
Frederick A. Wallis
Elam Huddleston
Bailey P. Wootton

Results

General election

Candidates
Major party candidates
Happy Chandler, Democratic
King Swope, Republican 

Other candidates
W. E. Cissna, Prohibition
W. A. Sandefur, Socialist
Herman Horning, Socialist Labor
John J. Thobe, Independent

Results

References

1935
Kentucky
1935 Kentucky elections